There are ten U.S. states with container deposit legislation, popularly called "bottle bills" after the Oregon Bottle Bill, the first such legislation passed.   

Container deposit legislation mandates a refundable deposit on certain types of recyclable beverage containers. Studies show that the recycling rate for beverage containers is vastly increased with a bottle bill. The United States' overall beverage container recycling rate is approximately 33%, while states with container deposit laws have a 70% average rate of beverage container recycling. Michigan's recycling rate of 97% from 1990 to 2008 was the highest in the nation, as is its ten-cent deposit. Studies also show that beverage container legislation has reduced total roadside litter by between 30% and 64% in the states with bottle bills. 

Proponents of container deposit legislation have pointed to the small financial obligations of the states, as financing these programs are the responsibility of the beverage industry and consumers. Producers are responsible for disposing of returned products, while consumers are responsible for collecting their refunds.

In Connecticut, Maine, Michigan, and Massachusetts the courts have ruled that unclaimed deposits are deemed abandoned by the public and are therefore property of the state. These states use this money to fund other environmental programs. In California and Hawaii uncollected deposits are used to cover the administrative costs of the deposit program. In Iowa and Oregon the beverage distribution industry keeps the unredeemed deposits. Iowa and Oregon's systems are similar and it was found to be highly profitable for beverage distributors in Iowa. Between March and June 2020, most states with container deposit legislation, except for California and Hawaii, temporarily suspended bottle bill requirements as a result of the COVID-19 pandemic.

States with container deposits 

 California (5¢; for bottles  or greater, 10¢), California Beverage Container Recycling and Litter Reduction Act (AB 2020) implemented in 1987, last revision made October 2010. Listed on containers as "California Redemption Value", or "CRV", or "CA Cash Refund" or similar notations. Beverages covered under the act are beer and malt beverages, distilled spirit coolers and wine coolers, and all non-alcoholic beverages except milk, 100 percent vegetable juice in containers larger than 16 ounces, and 100 percent fruit juice in containers 46 ounces or larger. Other notable beverage excluded from CRV are wine, distilled spirits, medical food and baby formula. Container types are aluminum, glass, plastic resins 1–7, bi-metals (exempts refillables). The recycling rate for beverage containers of all materials in 2011 was 82%. California imposes sales tax on the CRV if the beverage is taxable. The sales tax is not refunded to consumers upon redeeming the empty containers to a recycling center. Some recycling centers have attracted drug activity and crimes. In one example in Haight-Ashbury, a recycling center was ordered shut by the city in 2012 due to drug activity crime.
 Connecticut (5¢), Beverage Container Deposit and Redemption Law 1980; not charged on milk (deposit on water bottles went into effect October 1, 2009). Applies to beer, carbonated soft drinks (including mineral water and soda waters) and non-carbonated beverages; "non-carbonated beverages" means water, including flavored water, nutritionally enhanced water and any beverage that is identified through the use of letters, words or symbols on such beverage's product label as a type of water, but excluding juice and mineral water. Beverage container types include bottles, jars, or cartons made from glass, metal, or plastic.
 Hawaii (5¢), Solid Waste Management Deposit Beverage Container Law (Act 176). Enacted in June 2002. In addition, Hawaii charges a nonrefundable 1¢ fee per container to fund the program. This fee increases to 1.5¢ if the redemption rate reaches 70%. All non-alcoholic beverage (excluding dairy), beer, malt, mixed spirits, and wine.
 Iowa (5¢ for containers that held carbonated beverages), Beverage Container Deposit Law 1978. Beverages of beer, wine coolers, wine, liquor, soda pop, mineral water. Bottles, cans, jars, or cartons made of glass, plastic, or metal. Iowa code 455C requires that retailers take back containers of what they sell and it is a misdemeanor to fail to comply, but The Des Moines Register reports that officials say enforcement is almost non-existent. 
 Maine (5¢ on fruit juice, soda, beer and bottled water; 15¢ for most liquor and wine cans/bottles), Maine Returnable Beverage Container Law 1978. All potable liquids, except dairy and unprocessed cider. All glass, metal, or plastic containers  or smaller, excluding blueberry juice and apple cider produced in Maine. Redemption centers are paid a processing fee of 3-4¢ per container by the distributor. There are some redemption centers that pay the clients in excess of deposit value, sharing part of the fee they receive from the distributor to encourage them to conduct business at the store.
 Massachusetts Bottle Bill (5¢ for containers that held carbonated beverages), Beverage Container Recovery Law enacted in 1982. Beverages include beer, malt, soda, mineral water in jars, cartons, bottles, or cans made of glass, metal, plastic, or a combination. The redemption rate of covered containers is 72.3%, though due to an increase in sales of non-carbonated beverages, over 30% of beverage containers sold are not covered and are recycled at a much lower rate.
 Michigan (10¢ non-refillable, 10¢ refillable), Michigan Beverage Container Act of 1976. For beverages of beer, pop, carbonated and mineral water, wine coolers, canned cocktails. In containers made of metal, glass, paper, or plastic under .
 New York (5¢), New York State Returnable Container Law 1982. For containers under one gallon that held carbonated beverages or water (the law was amended to include water containers on October 31, 2009). Beverages include beer, malt beverages, soda, juice spritzers containing added water or sugar, wine product, and bottled water without added sugar. Hard cider and wine are exempt from the deposit, whether or not they are carbonated. Container types are metal, glass, paper, plastic or a combination under .
 Oregon (10¢), the Oregon Bottle Bill passed in 1971. Covered beverages carry a mandatory refund value, which means a redemption value must be paid upon presentation of containers, however, retailers are not required to charge the deposit.
Beverages covered include beer, malt, soda, bottled water, juice, coffee, kombucha, coconut water, ready-to-use mixers, nutritional supplements, smoothies, protein shakes, non-alcoholic wine, drinking vinegar, marijuana beverages, sports drinks, energy drinks and most other beverages. The only exceptions are for wine, liquor, dairy or plant-based milk, meal replacement beverages, and infant formula. Included are bottles, cans, or jars made of glass, metal, or plastic. Redemption rate has been as high as 94%, but dropped to 83% by 2005 and to 64.5% in 2015, the decline ultimately triggering a scheduled increase in the redemption value to 10¢ effective April 2017.
 Vermont (5¢; for most liquor bottles, 15¢), Beverage Container Law 1973. Includes beer, malt, soda, mixed wine drinks, liquor. Containers included are bottles, cans, jars, or cartons composed of glass, metal, paper, plastic, or a combination.

Repealed legislation 
 Delaware (5¢), Beverage Container Regulation 1982 [Repealed in 2009]. Included beer, malt, ale, soft drinks, mineral water, soda water, and covered all containers under  (with the exception of aluminum). Container deposit legislation was repealed by Senate Bill 234. As of December 1, 2010, consumers no longer paid a deposit on containers; no refunds were paid after February 1, 2011. Delaware had a non-refundable 4¢ tax per beverage container sold, which retailers remitted to the state monthly. This fee expired as of December 1, 2014.

Proposed legislation 
There have regularly been campaigns in the early 21st century to introduce container-deposit laws in various U.S. states and territories, or to improve or expand existing legislation, including but not limited to the following initiatives: 

 Washington State had Washington Beverage Container Deposit on the November 6, 1979, ballot as Initiative 61. Had it passed it would have established a minimum 5¢ deposit. However, measure was defeated with 57.63% voters rejecting the proposition.

 Texas unsuccessfully attempted to introduce a bottle bill in 2011. The bill set a redemption goal of 75%, with a deposit rate of 10¢ for containers  or less, and 15¢ for larger containers. Beverages covered would have been: beer, malt, carbonated soft drinks, mineral water, wine, coffee, tea, juices, flavored waters, and non-carbonated waters (dairy products excluded). The Texas bottle bill did not gather enough votes.

 Tennessee had attempted to pass the Tennessee Bottle Bill in 2009 and 2010, which was projected to increase its recycling rate from 10% to 80%.

 The Massachusetts legislature failed over several sessions to expand its bottle law to cover bottled water and sports drinks in line with its New England neighbors. Massachusetts environmental activists attempted a ballot petition in November 2014. The bill failed 27% to 73%. The beverage industry funded over 80% of a more than $9 million campaign, which outspent environmental groups by a margin of more than 6 to 1.

Criminal offenses related to container deposits 
Numerous instances of criminal offenses have occurred motivated by the cash refund value of empty containers, such as theft of cases of water from a retail store, burglary into a concession stand, welfare fraud, and theft of bagged empties from a private residence. In Salem, Oregon, Douglas McKay High School athletic concession stand was burgled where approximately ten 24 pack cases of beverages were emptied inside the building and empty containers stolen. The vice president of the club suggested the thieves committed the crime of returning empties for cash at the BottleDrop redemption facility nearby. A Medford, Oregon woman was charged with theft of $40 worth of bottled water from Albertsons. A video of the same woman dumping the empty bottles at the BottleDrop facility operated by the Oregon Beverage Recycling Cooperative has circulated on the Internet. A parolee from Wayne County, New York was charged with illegal exchange/sale of items purchased on food stamps following a purchase of 1,000 bottles of bottled water and dumping them out to cash out on the container deposit. A machete-wielding male subject was observed taking a bag of empty cans set aside on the porch in front of the house and was confronted by a neighbor in Medford, Oregon.

In July 2020, a man in Aloha, Oregon attacked another man that was scavenging refundable containers in a residential neighborhood to steal his cans.

See also 
Container deposit legislation
Recycling in the United States
Environment of the United States
History of bottle recycling in the United States

References

External links 
Map with links to text of U.S. bottle bill laws, LawServer
California's Bottle Bill
Tennessee Bottle Bill Project
Senator Jim Jefford's National Bottle Bill
Hawaii Dept of Health Bottle Deposit Law Site
Texas Bottle Bill
Abstract: Congressional Research Service 93-114 ENR. "Bottle Bills and Curbside Recycling: Are They Compatible?"
Congressional Research Service 93-114 ENR. "Bottle Bills and Curbside Recycling: Are They Compatible?"

Container deposit legislation
Recycling in the United States
Waste legislation in the United States